Nigel David Goldenfeld (born May 1, 1957) is a Swanlund Chair, Professor of Physics Department in the University of Illinois at Urbana-Champaign (UIUC), the director of the NASA Astrobiology Institute for Universal Biology, and the leader of the Biocomplexity group at Carl R. Woese Institute for Genomic Biology. Goldenfeld is a co-founder of Numerix and the author of the 1993 textbook "Lectures on Phase Transitions and the Renormalization Group," a widely used graduate textbook in statistical physics.

References

External links
 Nigel Goldenfeld, YouTube videos

1957 births
University of Illinois faculty
Alumni of the University of Cambridge
Living people
Santa Fe Institute people
Fellows of the American Physical Society
Members of the United States National Academy of Sciences
Fellows of the American Academy of Arts and Sciences